The 1994 CFL season is considered to be the 41st season in modern-day Canadian football, although it is officially the 37th Canadian Football League season.

CFL news in 1994

Expansion
The CFL admitted three more United States-based teams, to add to the Sacramento Gold Miners, who were introduced in 1993.

The Las Vegas Posse, the Shreveport Pirates and the Baltimore CFLers made the league 12 teams in total, six in each division. The new teams started play in 1994, with Las Vegas joining the Sacramento Gold Miners in the West Division, and Baltimore and Shreveport joining the East Division.

The Baltimore team was to be called the Baltimore Colts, but the Colts name was revoked due to a successful trademark infringement lawsuit filed by the Indianapolis Colts, and they played the entire season as the "Baltimore CFLers".

Regular season structure
Due to the expansion, this was the first season since 1980 when CFL teams did not travel to every other stadium in the League during the season.

CFL teams played each team in their own division twice, two teams in the other division twice, and the four remaining teams in the other division only once. The two inter-Divisional opponents to be played twice were determined by the previous season's regular season standing. Teams who had finished first and third in 1993 played the first and third teams from the other division twice – and the same applied to the teams who had finished second and fourth in each division, and the effective "fifth" and "sixth" place teams. Since Sacramento finished fifth in 1993, and since the other three U.S. expansion teams were deemed "fifth" and "sixth" place for the purposes of the schedule, this format ensured that the U.S. teams all played one another twice for the 1994 season.

The divisions were rearranged again in the 1995 CFL season, when the league expanded to 13 teams for one season.

Ownership changes
In February, Bruce Firestone purchased the Ottawa Rough Riders from the Glieberman family, clearing the way for the Gliebermans to assume the Shreveport Pirates.

In May, the JLL Broadcast Group purchased the Toronto Argonauts after John Candy died (Candy had put his stake in the team up for sale hours before he died) and Bruce McNall was arrested on fraud charges.

Uniform changes
The Ottawa Rough Riders unveiled a new logo based on a head profile of a mustached lumberjack. Their colours were also updated with light navy replacing black and the addition of metallic gold, red was kept.

New logos and uniforms also were designed for the expansion teams in Baltimore, Las Vegas and Shreveport. The Shreveport Pirates' team colours were purple, silver, orange and black with a side profile of a pirate's head inside a delta. The Las Vegas Posse chose a simpler logo and colour choice. The logo was a sheriff's tin star with "LV" imposed on it. Their colours were black and desert sand. Baltimore adopted a color scheme that added silver to the Colts' traditional colors of blue and white, as well as a stylized horse's head logo. Despite the team being unable to use the "Colts" name, it continued using the logo and colours for the entire season as well as the following season, by which time owner Jim Speros had settled on "Stallions" as his team's official nickname.

Game records set
In a July 14, 1994, matchup of the Winnipeg Blue Bombers and Edmonton Eskimos, Matt Dunigan passed for a remarkable 713 yards, setting a CFL record that still stands.

Allen Pitts set the record for receiving yards in one season with 2,036 yards while his teammate Doug Flutie set the record for passing touchdowns with 48.

The Grey Cup
BC Place Stadium played host to the Grey Cup game on Sunday, November 27, making Vancouver the host city for the twelfth time-more than any other Western Canadian city. In the Grey Cup game, the hometown BC Lions were against the Baltimore CFLers, becoming the first ever Grey Cup game between a Canada-based team and a US-based team. The Lions ended up defeating the Baltimore team by a score of 26–23, on Lui Passaglia's game-winning field goal on the last play of the game.

Regular season standings

Final regular season standings
Note: GP = Games Played, W = Wins, L = Losses, T = Ties, PF = Points For, PA = Points Against, Pts = Points

Bold text means that they have clinched the playoffs.

Grey Cup playoffs

The BC Lions are the 1994 Grey Cup champions, defeating the Baltimore CFLers 26–23, in front of their home crowd at Vancouver's BC Place Stadium. It was the first football championship game between Canadian and American teams. The CFLers' Karl Anthony (DB) was named the Grey Cup's Most Valuable Player and Lions' Lui Passaglia (K/P) was the Grey Cup's Most Valuable Canadian.

Playoff bracket

1994 CFL All-Stars

Offence
QB – Doug Flutie, Calgary Stampeders
FB – Sean Millington, BC Lions
RB – Mike Pringle, Baltimore CFLers
SB – Allen Pitts, Calgary Stampeders
SB – Gerald Wilcox, Winnipeg Blue Bombers
WR – Paul Masotti, Toronto Argonauts
WR – Rod Harris, Sacramento Gold Miners
C – Mike Anderson, Saskatchewan Roughriders
OG – Pierre Vercheval, Toronto Argonauts
OG – Rocco Romano, Calgary Stampeders
OT – Shar Pourdanesh, Baltimore CFLers
OT – Chris Walby, Winnipeg Blue Bombers

Defence
DT – Bennie Goods, Edmonton Eskimos
DT – Rodney Harding, Toronto Argonauts
DE – Will Johnson, Calgary Stampeders
DE – Tim Cofield, Hamilton Tiger-Cats
LB – Ron Goetz, Saskatchewan Roughriders
LB – Willie Pless, Edmonton Eskimos
LB – Calvin Tiggle, Toronto Argonauts
CB – Less Browne, BC Lions
CB – Irvin Smith, Baltimore CFLers
DB – Charles Gordon, BC Lions
DB – Robert Holland, Edmonton Eskimos
DS – Greg Knox, Calgary Stampeders

Special teams
P – Josh Miller, Baltimore CFLers
K – Mark McLoughlin, Calgary Stampeders
ST – Henry "Gizmo" Williams, Edmonton Eskimos

1994 Western All-Stars

Offence
QB – Doug Flutie, Calgary Stampeders
FB – Sean Millington, BC Lions
RB – Mike Saunders, Saskatchewan Roughriders
SB – Allen Pitts, Calgary Stampeders
SB – Darren Flutie, BC Lions
WR – Ray Alexander, BC Lions
WR – Rod Harris, Sacramento Gold Miners
C – Mike Anderson, Saskatchewan Roughriders
OG – Rob Smith, BC Lions
OG – Rocco Romano, Calgary Stampeders
OT – Bruce Covernton, Calgary Stampeders
OT – Blake Dermott, Edmonton Eskimos

Defence
DT – Bennie Goods, Edmonton Eskimos
DT – Stu Laird, Calgary Stampeders
DE – Will Johnson, Calgary Stampeders
DE – Bobby Jurasin, Saskatchewan Roughriders
LB – Ron Goetz, Saskatchewan Roughriders
LB – Willie Pless, Edmonton Eskimos
LB – Marvin Pope, Calgary Stampeders
CB – Less Browne, BC Lions
CB – Albert Brown, Saskatchewan Roughriders
DB – Charles Gordon, BC Lions
DB – Robert Holland, Edmonton Eskimos
DS – Greg Knox, Calgary Stampeders

Special teams
P – Tony Martino, Calgary Stampeders
K – Mark McLoughlin, Calgary Stampeders
ST – Henry "Gizmo" Williams, Edmonton Eskimos

1994 Eastern All-Stars

Offence
QB – Matt Dunigan, Winnipeg Blue Bombers
FB – Peter Tuipulotu, Baltimore CFLers
RB – Mike Pringle, Baltimore CFLers
SB – Chris Armstrong, Baltimore CFLers
SB – Gerald Wilcox, Winnipeg Blue Bombers
WR – Paul Masotti, Toronto Argonauts
WR – Earl Winfield, Hamilton Tiger-Cats
C – Nick Subis, Baltimore CFLers
OG – Pierre Vercheval, Toronto Argonauts
OG – David Black, Winnipeg Blue Bombers
OT – Shar Pourdanesh, Baltimore CFLers
OT – Chris Walby, Winnipeg Blue Bombers

Defence
DT – Ben Williams, Shreveport Pirates
DT – Rodney Harding, Toronto Argonauts
DE – John Kropke, Ottawa Rough Riders
DE – Tim Cofield, Hamilton Tiger-Cats
LB – Daved Benefield, Ottawa Rough Riders
LB – Michael O'Shea, Hamilton Tiger-Cats
LB – Calvin Tiggle, Toronto Argonauts
CB – Donald Smith, Winnipeg Blue Bombers
CB – Irvin Smith, Baltimore CFLers
DB – Joe Fuller, Shreveport Pirates
DB – Bobby Evans, Winnipeg Blue Bombers
DS – Michael Brooks, Baltimore CFLers

Special teams
P – Josh Miller, Baltimore CFLers
K – Troy Westwood, Winnipeg Blue Bombers
ST – Pinball Clemons, Toronto Argonauts

1994 CFL Awards
CFL's Most Outstanding Player Award – Doug Flutie (QB), Calgary Stampeders
CFL's Most Outstanding Canadian Award – Gerald Wilcox (SB), Winnipeg Blue Bombers
CFL's Most Outstanding Defensive Player Award – Willie Pless (LB), Edmonton Eskimos
CFL's Most Outstanding Offensive Lineman Award – Shar Pourdanesh (OT), Baltimore CFLers
CFL's Most Outstanding Rookie Award – Matt Goodwin (DB), Baltimore CFLers
CFLPA's Outstanding Community Service Award – O. J. Brigance (LB), Baltimore CFLers
CFL's Coach of the Year – Don Matthews, Baltimore CFLers
Commissioner's Award - Norm Fieldgate, BC Lions

References

External links
 Dennis KC Parks' famous rendition of Oh Canada at the Las Vegas Posse's season opener against the Saskatchewan Roughriders.  A moment of which to be proud

CFL
Canadian Football League seasons